Sackville Records was a Canadian record company and label that specialized in jazz. In 2011, with Sackville defunct, Delmark Records acquired its catalogue.

Sackville was founded in 1968 in Toronto, Ontario, Canada by John Norris and Bill Smith of the jazz magazine CODA. The bulk of the label's new releases were from sessions recorded in Canada. It has also done reissues. In the 1990s it became the distributor for American Music, Chiaroscuro, Nagel-Heyer, Classics, Storyville, and Timeless.

Its catalogue included Doc Cheatham, Don Ewell, Art Hodes, Keith Ingham, Geoffrey Keezer, Humphrey Lyttelton, Harold Mabern, Junior Mance, Jay McShann, Don Menza, Sammy Price, Don Pullen, Frank Rosolino, Archie Shepp, Ralph Sutton, and Buddy Tate.

Roster

Ian Bargh
Ed Bickert
Ruby Braff
Anthony Braxton
Doc Cheatham
Don Ewell
Jim Galloway
Sonny Greenwich
Herb Hall
Milt Hinton
Art Hodes
Steve Holt
Keith Ingham
JMOG
Geoff Keezer
Humphrey Lyttelton
Harold Mabern
Junior Mance
George Masso
Jay McShann
Don Menza
Sammy Price
Don Pullen
Red Richards
Frank Rosolino
Andrew Scott
Archie Shepp
Willie "The Lion" Smith
Ralph Sutton
Barbara Sutton Curtis
Buddy Tate
Charles Thompson

References

Record labels established in 1968
Canadian independent record labels
Jazz record labels
1968 establishments in Canada
 
Defunct record labels of Canada